Plouyé ("Parish of Ia") is a commune in the Finistère department of Brittany in northwestern France.

Population
Inhabitants of Plouyé are called in French Plouyéziens.

See also
Communes of the Finistère department

References

Mayors of Finistère Association

External links

Official website 

Communes of Finistère